The Grampian Speleological Group is the oldest caving club in Scotland, having been founded in 1961. It is also the largest, with members exploring caves across Britain and the world.

See also

Caving in the United Kingdom

References

External links
Homepage of the Grampian Speleological Group
"Bringing out the Bone Caves' dead" BBC report on GSG's retrieval of ancient remains

Caving in Scotland
Caving organisations in the United Kingdom
1961 establishments in Scotland
Sports organizations established in 1961